Score Media and Gaming Inc. is a digital media company based in Toronto, Canada, often referred to as theScore. It was founded in 2012 by John S. Levy, the company's Chief Executive Officer and Chairman. The company owns and operates digital sports media and sports betting products which deliver sports scores, data, news, and sportsbook offerings via emerging and established platforms. The company also previously owned The Score Television Network, which was acquired by Rogers Communications in October 2012 and is today known as Sportsnet 360. The transaction did not include theScore's digital media assets, including its mobile apps and websites.

The company was spun-out from Score Media immediately prior to Rogers' acquisition. As a result of the transaction, former shareholders of Score Media received one share of the new company for each share held in Score Media, meaning that Score Media founder John Levy and family are the largest single voting shareholders in the company, as was the case with Score Media, though Rogers received additional shares yielding an ownership stake of 11.8%. Rogers subsequently sold its shares in theScore in June 2014.

As of Q1 F2020 (Aug-Nov 2019), theScore's mobile sports media application was used by an average of 4.3 million monthly active users worldwide, 62% of which were in the United States, 27% in Canada and 11% in other international markets. The company is publicly traded and was listed on the TSX Venture Exchange until September 2020 when it was promoted to the Toronto Stock Exchange. Since March 2021, The Score is listed on Nasdaq, under the SCR ticker.

In August 2021, Penn National Gaming agreed to acquire Score Media and Gaming Inc. for $2 billion in cash and stocks. The deal completed in October 2021 and the company was delisted from the Toronto Stock Exchange and the Nasdaq.

History

Sportscope 

Launched in 1994 as Sportscope, theScore originally began as a network focusing on providing sports scores, airing in seven Canadian provinces. Sportscope's programming consisted solely of an alphanumeric text rotation of sports scores, news, and sports betting information, which aired alongside local and national advertising slides. As it did not include any video content, it did not require a CRTC licence.

Headline Sports 
Sportscope was granted an English-language specialty channel licence by the Canadian Radio-television and Telecommunications Commission on September 4, 1996, provisionally titled "Sportscope Plus". The channel was launched in May 1997 as 'Headline Sports' and was a national 24-hour anchor-at-desk sports information service. Advertising was also introduced, something that did not exist during the Sportscope era. The oldies music was replaced by modern stock music during text rotation of sports scores and news. The channel also contained a constantly updated ticker at the bottom of the screen, providing sports news and scores, as it still does today, per its CRTC licence requirements. There were plans to air different tickers in each region of the country and additional streams of alphanumeric data (perhaps via an alternate channel) when the channel was launched, but those plans were abandoned.

theScore 
In March 2000, Headline Sports' licence was amended by the CRTC to allow live sports programming, under the conditions that the channel display the ticker and that breaks away from live coverage occur at least once every 15 minutes to present video highlights. As a result of this – the channel was rebranded as 'theScore Television Network' that year. On June 6, 2006, theScore revamped its ticker, alongside the launch of a new HD channel. On September 20, 2011, Score Media announced that it would put theScore Television Network up for sale.

Purchase by Rogers 
In August 2012, Rogers Communications, owners of the competing network Sportsnet, acquired theScore's parent company with Score Media retaining all of the company's digital assets.

Products

theScore 

‘theScore’ media app was launched in 2007 as the company's first venture into the mobile app industry. It has since become one of the most popular multi-sport news apps in North America with approximately 4-5 million active users. Available on iOS and Android, the app delivers sports content through a combination of real-time news, scores, stats, and videos for all major leagues, including the National Football League, NCAA Football and Basketball, the National Basketball Association, Major League Baseball, the National Hockey League, PGA Golf, NASCAR Racing, Major League Soccer, major European soccer leagues, and more. News stories published to the app are produced by a combination of the theScore's mobile-first newsroom, where a team of editors across North America create content via a content management system that delivers news directly to users’ mobile devices. Primary sections on theScore app include ‘News’, ‘Scores’, ‘Favorites’, and ‘Discover’.

theScore Bet 
theScore's mobile sportsbook offering launched in the United States on September 3, 2019, marking the first time that a media company in North America had created and operated a mobile sportsbook in the United States.

Anyone physically located in the United States is able to download the theScore Bet app with wagering supported for those physically located inside the states of New Jersey, Colorado, and Indiana.

In May 2018, the Supreme Court of the United States struck down the Professional and Amateur Sports Protection Act of 1992, an act that largely outlawed sports betting in the United States. theScore came out in support of the Supreme Court ruling, where Levy stated in a press release: “We’ve been watching this space for some time and eagerly anticipating this ruling. The ruling unlocks exciting opportunities and we are uniquely positioned to deliver amazing fan experiences on mobile and in-game as the betting market develops.”

On December 18, 2018, theScore became the first media company to announce plans to launch a mobile sportsbook in the United States after securing market access through an official licensing partnership with Darby Development LLC, the operator behind the New Jersey-based Monmouth Park Racetrack. The partnership paved the way for theScore to offer online and mobile sports betting across the state of New Jersey.

In August 2019, theScore and Penn National Gaming, the largest regional gaming operator in the United States, entered into a strategic multi-state market access framework agreement, providing theScore the rights to obtain online and mobile sports wagering in an additional 11 states.

In September 2019, theScore launched theScore Bet in New Jersey under its market access agreement with Darby Development LLC, the operator of Monmouth Park Racetrack.

theScore esports 
Launched in 2015, is theScore's online platform dedicated to reporting news for all major competitive video games and players. Its primary distribution platform for content is YouTube, and in November 2019, the channel surpassed over one million total subscribers on the platform, making it the leading source for competitive gaming coverage. The channel's rapid growth is a part of the company's broader strategy to uncoil the esports industry through a wide range of content offerings. As of December 2020, theScore esports YouTube channel had more than 1.5 million subscribers.

Emerging Platforms 
In 2017, theScore launched new skills for Amazon’s virtual Assistant, Alexa, to deliver sports news and updates on command. The capabilities for Alexa – known as ‘skills’ – include daily ‘flash briefings’ for theScore and theScore esports, offering a two-minute audio summary of all the major headlines that matter. Fans with an Alexa device can select theScore as their flash briefing and ask “Alexa – what’s in the news?” and theScore will deliver a comprehensive audio sports briefing.

In 2018, theScore extended its virtual assistant capabilities with its launch on Bixby, the virtual assistant developed by Samsung Electronics. Users across the United States on select Samsung Galaxy devices, including the Galaxy S9 and S9+, can now receive personalized live scores and breaking news on their Bixby Home. By simply swiping right on their home screen to the Bixby Home service, the integration provides fans the ability to view theScore's sports headlines for a wide range of sports, including the FIFA World Cup, NFL, NBA, NHL, MLB, and EPL. If users want access to deeper information beyond a score or news headline, they can tap on theScore's content card on Bixby to be taken to theScore app, if already installed on their device.

Social Audience 
theScore employs a dedicated team of social media editors, content creators, and curators, who are responsible for sharing content through social platforms including Facebook, Twitter, Instagram and other third party platforms. In Q1 F2020, theScore's social content reached nearly 97 million users a month across its social media platforms.

In 2018, theScore expanded its content strategy by collaborating with pop culture figures and major sports athletes, focusing on telling the stories of their personal and professional triumphs. theScore premiered their new strategy with an 11-minute feature on NBA star, Lance Stephenson. The video received media coverage across major news platforms including ESPN, Sports Illustrated, NBC Sports, USA Today, and others, recording approximately 80 million earned media impressions. That year, theScore was named a finalist for Social Media Team of the Year in the annual Digiday Awards.

Since theScore expanded its content strategy, other athletes and celebrities, including Austin Rivers, Burna Boy, Enes Kanter, Diamond Dallas Page, Steve Nash, and Marshawn Lynch, have been exclusively featured across its social channels. For its viral piece titled ‘Enes the Menace’ starring NBA centre Enes Kanter and WWE Hall-of-Famer Diamond Dallas Page, theScore was named as a finalist for the Cynopsis Model D Award of Best Documentary.

Team

Leadership

John Levy, Chairman & Chief Executive Officer 

John is a media industry entrepreneur, growing his family's small cable business into one of the 10 largest distributors in the country before founding theScore. In October 2012, John and his team structured and executed the sale of Score Media's television assets to Rogers Media and the spin-out of Score Media's digital assets into a new entity – theScore, Inc. This allowed John and his team to focus on growing theScore's mobile platforms, including its flagship app ‘theScore’ and recently launched U.S. mobile sportsbook, ‘theScore Bet’.

Benjie Levy, President & Chief Operating Officer 
Benjie oversees the development and execution of theScore's business strategy and has been instrumental in shaping its digital media offerings, including the creation and launch of theScore's mobile apps. A graduate of the University of Toronto with a B.Com specializing in Finance, Benjie began his career as an investment banker in the Communications and Media group at BMO Nesbitt Burns in Toronto, prior to joining theScore in 2001.

Headquarters 

Score Media and Gaming Inc. is headquartered in Toronto, Canada, along King Street West. The facility, totalling approximately 30,881 square feet, houses the company's corporate, administration, sales and production teams; which, in total, consist of over 200 full-time employees. theScore also maintains offices in Hamilton, Ontario, which is partially owned by John Levy, the company's Chairman and Chief Executive Officer. This facility, totalling approximately 1,500 square feet, contains an executive office. It also maintains offices in New York City, New York, in a shared work space for the company's U.S.-based employees who are engaged in sales, marketing, and business development.

References

2012 establishments in Ontario
Canadian companies established in 2012
Mass media companies established in 2012
Companies formerly listed on the TSX Venture Exchange
Companies formerly listed on the Toronto Stock Exchange
Companies based in Toronto
Canadian sport websites
Gambling companies of Canada
Android (operating system) software
IOS software
Mobile software
Esports websites
Companies formerly listed on the Nasdaq
2021 mergers and acquisitions